Bunyawi Thamchaiwat (born 29 July 1998) is a Thai professional tennis player.

Career
She has won four singles and four doubles titles on the ITF Women's Circuit. On 24 September 2018, she reached her best singles ranking of world No. 410, and at 17 September 2018 No. 631 in the doubles rankings.

Playing for Thailand Fed Cup team, Thamchaiwat has a win–loss record of 3–0.

ITF finals

Singles: 9 (4 titles, 5 runner–ups)

Doubles: 7 (4 titles, 3 runner–ups)

References

External links
 
 
 

1999 births
Living people
Bunyawi Thamchaiwat
Bunyawi Thamchaiwat
Bunyawi Thamchaiwat
Oklahoma State Cowgirls tennis players
San Diego State Aztecs women's tennis players